Prologue was a publication of the U.S. National Archives and Records Administration (NARA). The publication's articles are based on NARA's holdings and programs and material from the regional archives and the presidential libraries across the United States.

The magazine was founded by James B. Rhoads, fifth archivist of the United States. The first issue of Prologue appeared in Spring 1969. The periodical's headquarters is in Atlanta, Georgia. The magazine ceased print publication in 2017.

References

External links
Official website at National Archives site
 Hathi Trust. Prologue

1969 establishments in Georgia (U.S. state)
2017 disestablishments in Georgia (U.S. state)
History magazines published in the United States
Defunct magazines published in the United States
Magazines established in 1969
Magazines disestablished in 2017
Magazines published in Atlanta
National Archives and Records Administration
Online magazines published in the United States
Online magazines with defunct print editions
Quarterly magazines published in the United States